Gypsies Are Found Near Heaven (lit. "The Gypsy camp goes to heaven"; also known as Queen of the Gypsies) is a 1975 Soviet romantic drama film by Emil Loteanu, loosely based on short stories "Makar Chudra" and "Old Izergil" by Maxim Gorky. Set in early 20th century Austria-Hungary, the film tells a love story between the Roma girl Rada and the horse thief Zobar of Gorky's early 1892 short story "Makar Chudra".

It was the most attended movie in the Soviet Union in 1976, with 64.9 million tickets sold.

Plot
The film takes place in the beginning of the 20th century in a Roma camp on the Tisza river in the Zakarpattia region on the outskirts of the Austro-Hungarian Empire.

Two young proud Roma, Loiko (Grigore Grigoriu) and Rada (Svetlana Toma) fall in love but believe that family life is a ball and chain that would fetter their independence. The first time Loiko meets Rada is when he becomes wounded and she finds him and heals him. Then the horse thief and the beauty meet again when Loiko accompanies Bucha (Borislav Brondukov) from Rada's Gypsy camp and comes into the camp itself, which is headed by old Nur (Mikhail Shishkov).

Local middle-aged landowner-nobleman Antol Siladi (Ion Sandri Scurea) also falls in love with Rada whom he meets during his walks through the city, but she rejects him in full view of her camp and the unfortunate amorous gentleman curses the young Roma. The bold and lucky horse thief Loiko successfully steals a white mare as Rada wishes. However he incurs the wrath of the authorities who are preparing a raid in his encampment, and the proud and beautiful sister of Loiko – Rusalina (Nelli Volshaninova) makes resistance attempts. Loiko's father finally gives his son over to the gendarmes, who sent his friend Talimon (Pavel Andrejchenko) shortly before that to the master Balint (Vasyl Symchych) for the purpose of debt collection. Unfortunately Balint says that Loiko promised to come to the estate as it was previously understood, and his servant stabs the Gypsy with forks in the stables.

Meanwhile local authorities sentence Loiko to death but nevertheless Loiko manages to escape his penalty although he ends up losing his friend Bubulia (Sergiu Finiti) who comes to his aid. The horse thief catches up with Rada's Roma camp and presents the mare to her. Rada has fun with Loiko on the river bank and then spends the night with him during which she offers him grape juice.

At the end of the film Loiko, despite the gloomy predictions of the old Romani healer comes accompanied by his old friend Aralambi (Nikolai Volshaninov) into Rada's camp and asks his blacksmith friend Makar Choudhra (Barasbi Mulayev) to be his best man at the wedding [he thinks is going to happen]. Then, he walks up to Rada and has a dialogue where she doubts his mental strength by claiming he has tamed only tame horses so far. He admits (is unfazed) and holds a speech where he says that he would kneel in front of her and kiss her hand. Rada humiliates him however by whipping his legs so that he falls. Loiko stands up and demands her hand, instead of kneeling first. She demands that he fulfills his claim that he would get on his knees and kiss her hand. But he refuses to do so and demands her hand once again. And again she refuses, so he draws a knife and stabs her in the chest, killing her. The father of Rada – the old soldier Danilo (Vsevolod Gavrilov) who was present at his daughter's murder, stabs Loiko in the back, killing him whilst Loiko holds Rada and panics after what he has done.

Cast
 Svetlana Toma as Rada
 Grigore Grigoriu as Loiko Sobar 
 Barasbi Mulayev as Makar Tschudra
 Mikhail Shishkov as Nur
 Boryslav Brondukov as Bucha
 Vsevolod Gavrilov as Danilo
 Ion Sandri Scurea as Antol Siladi
 Nelli Volshaninova as Rusalina
 Pavel Andrejchenko as Talimon
 Vasyl Symchych   as Balint
 Sergiu Finiti as Bubulia
 Nikolai Volshaninov as Aralambi
 Lyalya Chyornaya as Old Gypsy Woman
Maria Kapnist as Izergil

Production
The film skillfully captures music and dancing. Songs such as "Malyarkitsa", "Dyves and rat", "Apple", "Nane tsoha" and others which were previously sung in the 1930s were chosen by composer Eugene Doga and sung anew by Roma theater performers from the Romen Theatre. Roma cameos in the film were played by actors of that theater and of the Moldavian film studio, and the role of the mayor and his entourage - the actors of the Lithuanian Film Studios because the episodes were filmed in the city of Vilnius and Kaunas, as the old architecture of these cities sometimes closely resembles that of a Bessarabian town.

See also
Fictional representations of Roma
Time of the Gypsies

External links

References

1975 films
1975 romantic drama films
Soviet romantic drama films
Russian romantic drama films
Mosfilm films
1970s Russian-language films
Films about Romani people
Films based on works by Maxim Gorky
Films directed by Emil Loteanu
1970s musical drama films
Soviet musical drama films
Russian musical drama films